Keith Bunin (born c. 1971) is an American dramatist and screenwriter.   His plays include The Credeaux Canvas, The World Over, and The Busy World is Hushed, all of which have been produced by Playwrights Horizons.

Life and career
Bunin was born in Poughkeepsie, New York. The son of "a half-Jewish father [and] a Catholic mother," he was first "raised in the Episcopal Church," then attended Oakwood Friends School, a Quaker prep school. He ascribes his religious viewpoints, as manifested in works such as The Busy World is Hushed, to this "polyglot religious" upbringing.  He moved to New York to attend film school at NYU, then graduated from Goddard College and received a master's degree from Columbia University.

In his 2002 review of The Credeaux Canvas, Alvin Klein of The New York Times called Bunin "a brainy young playwright with the mighty mission of combatting mindlessness" and said his "works reveal a boundless sense of wonder".

Bunin wrote the "Oliver" episodes for season 2 of the HBO series In Treatment, as well as the screenplay for the 2013 film Horns, based on the novel by Joe Hill.  In 2012 it was reported that Philip Seymour Hoffman had agreed to direct Bunin's screenplay, Ezekiel Moss, which had been included on the 2011 "Black List" of most promising unproduced screenplays.

References 

http://sorrowsdramaturgy.wikispaces.com/Keith+Bunin+-+The+Playwright
http://lisathatcher.wordpress.com/2013/03/26/the-credeaux-canvas-sure-foot-productions-does-keith-bunin-theatre-review/

External links 

1971 births
Living people
American dramatists and playwrights
American male screenwriters
Writers from Poughkeepsie, New York
Goddard College alumni
Columbia University alumni
Tisch School of the Arts alumni
Year of birth uncertain
American male dramatists and playwrights
Screenwriters from New York (state)